VA-36, nicknamed the Roadrunners, was an Attack Squadron of the U.S. Navy. It was established as Fighter Squadron VF-102 on 1 May 1952, redesignated VA-36 on 1 July 1955, and disestablished on 1 August 1970. It was the first squadron to be designated VA-36, the second VA-36 was established on 6 March 1987 and disestablished on 1 April 1994.

Operational history

 November 1953–September 1954: During the squadron's world cruise aboard , it visited 14 different ports in 10 foreign countries and transited the Suez and Panama Canals.
 July–August 1961: While deployed on a training cruise aboard  in the Caribbean Sea, the squadron was on an alert status due to the Bay of Pigs Invasion.
This marked the first time a nuclear powered ship had engaged in combat.
December 1965–June 1966: During this period of combat operations squadron personnel were awarded over 170 Air Medals.
Units of Americas air wing were launched to provide air cover for  when it came under attack by Israeli forces.

Home port assignments
The squadron was assigned to these home ports, effective on the dates shown:
 NAAS Cecil Field – 1 May 1952
 NAS Jacksonville – July 1955
 NAS Cecil Field – April 1956

Aircraft assignment
The squadron first received the following aircraft in the months shown:
 FG-1D Corsair – May 1952
 F9F-5 Panther – Oct 1952
 F9F-8 & F9F-8B Panther – 02 Nov 1956
 F9F-8T Panther – 14 Apr 1957
 A4D-2 Skyhawk – 11 Sep 1958
 A4D-2N/A-4C Skyhawk – 21 Mar 1961 (The A4D-2N designation changed to A-4C in 1962.)
 A-4E Skyhawk – Oct 1967 (The squadron began its transition to A-4Es in October 1967 and in November 1967 transitioned back to A-4Cs)

See also
 Attack aircraft
 History of the United States Navy
 List of inactive United States Navy aircraft squadrons

References

Attack squadrons of the United States Navy
Wikipedia articles incorporating text from the Dictionary of American Naval Aviation Squadrons